The Canon EF-M 18-55mm f/3.5-5.6 IS STM is an interchangeable wide angle lens for the Canon EOS M system of mirrorless cameras. It was announced by Canon Inc. on June 22, 2012. It was the kit lens of the Canon EOS M camera. The EOS M3 camera was only available with this kit lens. This lens was available from Canon USA from 2015 to 2018.

References

External links
http://www.dpreview.com/products/canon/lenses/canon_m_18-55_3p5-5p6
https://web.archive.org/web/20151005071420/http://www.canon.de/for_home/product_finder/cameras/ef_lenses/ef-m/ef_m_18-55mm_f_3.5_5.6_is_stm/
https://web.archive.org/web/20150616021437/http://www.canon.de/images/Preisliste_Canon_Consumer_Produkte_08062015_tcm83-376784.pdf

Canon EF-M-mount lenses
Camera lenses introduced in 2012